3/3/03 – Tokyo, Japan is a two-disc live album by the American alternative rock band Pearl Jam. It was released to retail stores on June 10, 2003.

Overview 
The album was recorded live at the Nippon Budokan in Tokyo, Japan on March 3, 2003. It is the only official bootleg that Pearl Jam released in stores from the Japanese leg of its Riot Act Tour, and it was one of six official bootlegs released overall to retail stores. AllMusic gave it four out of a possible five stars. AllMusic staff writer Jason Birchmeier said that "the Tokyo show is a particularly noteworthy one, if not simply for its retail availability, then for its political undertones as well as its emphasis on the older songs." It debuted at number 182 on the Billboard 200 album chart.
The song "Daughter" at the end contains a short cover of the Edwin Starr song "War".

Track listing

Disc one 
 "Release" (Jeff Ament, Stone Gossard, Dave Krusen, Mike McCready, Eddie Vedder) – 5:57
 "Can't Keep" (Vedder) – 3:44
 "Even Flow" (Vedder, Gossard) – 5:58
 "Save You" (Ament, Matt Cameron, Gossard, McCready, Vedder) – 3:39
 "Hail, Hail" (Gossard, Vedder, Ament, McCready) – 4:26
 "Dissident" (Dave Abbruzzese, Ament, Gossard, McCready, Vedder) – 3:44
 "Love Boat Captain" (Boom Gaspar, Vedder) – 5:18
 "Elderly Woman Behind the Counter in a Small Town" (Abbruzzese, Ament, Gossard, McCready, Vedder) – 3:25
 "Given to Fly" (McCready, Vedder) – 3:50
 "Lukin" (Vedder) – 0:57
 "Not for You" (Abbruzzese, Ament, Gossard, McCready, Vedder) – 5:34
 "Daughter" (Abbruzzese, Ament, Gossard, McCready, Vedder) – 7:29
 "You Are" (Cameron, Vedder) – 6:50
 "I Am Mine" (Vedder) – 3:34
 "Better Man" (Vedder) – 4:32

Disc two 
 "Corduroy" (Abbruzzese, Ament, Gossard, McCready, Vedder) – 5:01
 "Do the Evolution" (Gossard, Vedder) – 4:00
 "Blood" (Abbruzzese, Ament, Gossard, McCready, Vedder) – 2:56
 "Encore Break" – 0:32
 "Bu$hleaguer" (Gossard, Vedder) – 4:47
 "Know Your Rights" (Mick Jones, Joe Strummer) – 3:38
 "Go" (Abbruzzese, Ament, Gossard, McCready, Vedder) – 3:11
 "Black" (Vedder, Gossard) – 7:39
 "U" (Vedder) – 3:32
 "Breath" (Vedder, Gossard) – 5:06
 "Rearviewmirror" (Abbruzzese, Ament, Gossard, McCready, Vedder) – 8:17
 "Encore Break" – 1:02
 "Don't Be Shy" (Cat Stevens) – 3:38
 "Soon Forget" (Vedder) – 2:17
 "Last Kiss" (Wayne Cochran) – 3:50
 "Yellow Ledbetter" (Ament, McCready, Vedder) – 5:30
 "Alive" (Vedder, Gossard) – 6:13

Personnel

Pearl Jam
 Jeff Ament – bass guitar, design concept
 Matt Cameron – drums
 Stone Gossard – guitars
 Mike McCready – guitars
 Eddie Vedder – vocals, guitars, ukulele

Additional musicians and production
 Ed Brooks at RFI CD Mastering – mastering
 John Burton – engineering
 Brett Eliason – mixing
 Boom Gaspar – Hammond B3, Fender Rhodes
 Brad Klausen – design and layout

Charts

References 

Pearl Jam Official Bootlegs
2003 live albums
Epic Records live albums
Albums recorded at the Nippon Budokan